Rebecca Robisch (born 4 April 1988) is a German triathlete. She qualified for the 2016 Summer Olympics. She had a top-ten finish at the World Triathlon Series in Stockholm in 2015.

References

External links
 

1988 births
Living people
German female triathletes
Place of birth missing (living people)
German female marathon runners